The Baghdad Battery is the name given to a set of three artifacts which were found together: a ceramic pot, a tube of copper, and a rod of iron. It was discovered in present-day Khujut Rabu, Iraq in 1936, close to the metropolis of Ctesiphon, the capital of the Parthian (150 BC – 223 AD) and Sasanian (224–650 AD) empires, and it is believed to date from either of these periods.

Its origin and purpose remain unclear. It was hypothesized by Wilhelm König, at the time director of the National Museum of Iraq, that the object functioned as a galvanic cell, possibly used for electroplating, or some kind of electrotherapy, but there is no electroplated object known from this period, and the claims are near universally rejected by archaeologists. An alternative explanation is that it functioned as a storage vessel for sacred scrolls.

This artifact disappeared in 2003 during the US occupation of Iraq.

Physical description and dating 
At the top, the iron rod is isolated from the copper by bitumen, with plugs or stoppers, and both rod and cylinder fit snugly inside the opening of the jar. The copper cylinder is not watertight, so if the jar were filled with a liquid, this would surround the iron rod as well. The artifact had been exposed to the weather and had suffered corrosion.

Austrian archeologist Wilhelm König thought the objects might date to the Parthian period, between 250 BC and AD 224. However, according to St John Simpson of the Near Eastern department of the British Museum, their original excavation and context were not well-recorded, and evidence for this date range is very weak. Furthermore, the style of the pottery is Sassanid (224–640).

Theories concerning operation 
Its origin and purpose remain unclear. Wilhelm König was an assistant at the Iraq Museum in the 1930s. He had observed a number of very fine silver objects from ancient Iraq, plated with very thin layers of gold, and speculated that they were electroplated. In 1938 he authored a paper offering the hypothesis that they may have formed a galvanic cell, perhaps used for electroplating gold onto silver objects. This interpretation is rejected by skeptics.

Corrosion of the metal and tests both indicate that an acidic agent such as wine or vinegar was present in the jar. This led to speculation that the liquid was used as an acidic electrolyte solution to generate an electric current from the difference between the electrode potentials of the copper and iron electrodes.

Supporting experiments 

After the Second World War, Willard Gray demonstrated current production by a reconstruction of the inferred battery design when filled with grape juice. W. Jansen experimented with benzoquinone (some beetles produce quinones) and vinegar in a cell and got satisfactory performance. 

In 1978, Arne Eggebrecht reportedly reproduced the electroplating of gold onto a small statue. There are no (direct) written or photographic records of this experiment. The only records are segments of a television show.

Controversies over use

Lack of electrical connections 

Though the iron rod did project outside of the asphalt plug, the copper tube did not, making it impossible to connect a wire to this to complete a circuit.

Electroplating hypothesis 
König himself seems to have been mistaken on the nature of the objects he thought were electroplated. They were apparently fire-gilded (with mercury). Paul Craddock of the British Museum said "The examples we see from this region and era are conventional gold plating and mercury gilding. There's never been any irrefutable evidence to support the electroplating theory".

David A. Scott, senior scientist at the Getty Conservation Institute and head of its Museum Research Laboratory, writes: "There is a natural tendency for writers dealing with chemical technology to envisage these unique ancient objects of two thousand years ago as electroplating accessories (Foley 1977), but this is clearly untenable, for there is absolutely no evidence for electroplating in this region at the time".

Paul T. Keyser of the University of Alberta noted that Eggebrecht used a more efficient, modern electrolyte, and that using only vinegar, or other electrolytes available at the time assumed, the battery would be very feeble, and for that and other reasons concludes that even if this was in fact a battery, it could not have been used for electroplating. However, Keyser still supported the battery theory, but believed it was used for some kind of mild electrotherapy such as pain relief, possibly through electroacupuncture.

Bitumen as an insulator 
A bitumen seal, being thermoplastic, would be extremely inconvenient for a galvanic cell, which would require frequent topping up of the electrolyte for extended use.

Alternative hypothesis 
The artifacts are similar to other objects believed to be storage vessels for sacred scrolls from nearby Seleucia on the Tigris. Since these vessels were exposed to the elements, it is possible that any papyrus or parchment inside had completely rotted away, perhaps leaving a trace of slightly acidic organic residue.

The object was looted along with thousands of other artifacts from the National Museum during the 2003 invasion of Iraq.

In March 2012, Professor Elizabeth Stone of Stony Brook University, an expert on Iraqi archaeology, returning from the first archaeological expedition in Iraq after 20 years, stated that she does not know a single archaeologist who believed that these were batteries.

Media tests of viability 
The idea that the terracotta jars in certain circumstances could have been used to produce usable levels of electricity has been put to the test at least twice. On the third episode of the 1980 British Television series Arthur C. Clarke's Mysterious World, Egyptologist Arne Eggebrecht created a voltaic cell using a jar filled with grape juice, to produce half a volt of electricity, demonstrating for the programme that jars used this way could electroplate a silver statuette in two hours, using a gold cyanide solution. Eggebrecht speculated that museums could contain many items mislabelled as gold when they are merely electroplated.

The Discovery Channel program MythBusters built replicas of the jars to see if it was possible for them to have been used for electroplating or electrostimulation. On MythBusters 29th episode (23 March 2005), ten hand-made terracotta jars were fitted to act as batteries. Lemon juice was chosen as the electrolyte to activate the electrochemical reaction between the copper and iron. Connected in series, the batteries produced 4 volts of electricity. When linked in series, the cells had sufficient power to electroplate a small token and to deliver current to acupuncture type needles for therapeutic purposes, but not enough to deliver an electric shock to MythBusters co-host Adam Savage who was instead pranked by co-hosts who hooked him up to a 10,000 volt cattle fence shock generator. Archaeologist Ken Feder commented on the show noting that no archaeological evidence has been found either for connections between the jars (which would have been necessary to produce the required voltage) or for their use for electroplating.

See also 
 Dendera light
 Coso artifact – misinterpreted by some to be a 500,000-year-old spark plug
 History of the battery
 Leyden jar
 List of topics characterized as pseudoscience

Notes

References

External links
 

Pseudoscience
Pseudoarchaeology
Parthian Empire
Sasanian art
Battery (electricity)